Tunisia competed at the 2004 Summer Olympics in Athens, Greece, from 13 to 29 August 2004. This was the nation's eleventh appearance at the Olympics, except the 1980 Summer Olympics in Moscow because of its partial support to the United States boycott.

The Tunisian Olympic Committee (CNOT) sent the nation's largest delegation to the Games, surpassing the record by three athletes short in Atlanta eight years earlier. A total of 54 athletes, 44 men and 10 women, competed only in 14 sports. men's football, and men's indoor volleyball were the only team-based sports in which Tunisia had its representation at these Olympic Games. Among the sports played by the athletes, Tunisia marked its Olympic debut in artistic gymnastics and taekwondo. Five Tunisian athletes had previously competed in Sydney, including race walker Hatem Ghoula, and swimmer Oussama Mellouli, who won the bronze at the 2003 FINA World Championships in Barcelona, Spain. Meanwhile, volleyball team captain Noureddine Hfaiedh was the nation's flag bearer in the opening ceremony.

Athletics

Tunisian athletes have so far achieved qualifying standards in the following athletics events (up to a maximum of 3 athletes in each event at the 'A' Standard, and 1 at the 'B' Standard).

Men
Track & road events

Women
Field events

Boxing

Tunisia sent five boxers to Athens.

Fencing

Two Tunisian fencers qualified for the following events:

Men

Football

Men's tournament

The Tunisia national football team qualified for the Olympics after winning a very tight group with three other African football powers, Nigeria, Senegal and Egypt.

Roster

Group play

Gymnastics

Artistic
Men

Judo

Four Tunisian judoka (one male and three females) qualified for the 2004 Summer Olympics.

Men

Women

Rowing

Tunisian rowers qualified the following boats:

Men

Qualification Legend: FA=Final A (medal); FB=Final B (non-medal); FC=Final C (non-medal); FD=Final D (non-medal); FE=Final E (non-medal); FF=Final F (non-medal); SA/B=Semifinals A/B; SC/D=Semifinals C/D; SE/F=Semifinals E/F; R=Repechage

Sailing

Tunisian sailors have qualified one boat for each of the following events.

Men

M = Medal race; OCS = On course side of the starting line; DSQ = Disqualified; DNF = Did not finish; DNS= Did not start; RDG = Redress given

Swimming

Tunisian swimmers earned qualifying standards in the following events (up to a maximum of 2 swimmers in each event at the A-standard time, and 1 at the B-standard time):

Men

Table tennis

Two Tunisian table tennis players qualified for the following events.

Taekwondo

Three Tunisian taekwondo jin qualified for the following events.

Volleyball

Tunisia has qualified a men's team for the indoor tournament after earning a spot from the African Championships.

Men's tournament

Roster

Group play

Weightlifting 

Two Tunisian weightlifters qualified for the following events:

Wrestling 

Women's freestyle

See also
 Tunisia at the 2004 Summer Paralympics
 Tunisia at the 2005 Mediterranean Games

References

External links
Official Report of the XXVIII Olympiad
Tunisian Olympic Committee 

Nations at the 2004 Summer Olympics
2004
Olympics